Matthias Goerne (born 31 March 1967) is a German baritone. He has performed and recorded extensively, both on the opera stage and in Lieder settings. Goerne has been referred to as "Today's leading interpreter of German art songs" by the Chicago Tribune and as "one of the greatest singers performing today" by the Boston Globe.

Prominent opera stages on which Goerne has appeared include the Royal Opera House, Covent Garden; Teatro Real, Madrid; Paris National Opera; Vienna State Opera; and the Metropolitan Opera, New York. His carefully chosen roles range from Wolfram (Tannhäuser), Amfortas (Parsifal), Kurwenal (Tristan) and Orest (Electra) right up to the title roles in Alban Berg's Wozzeck, Bartók's Bluebeard's Castle, Hindemith's Mathis der Maler and Reimann's Lear.

In Lieder settings, he has worked with many pre-eminent pianists, including Alfred Brendel, Vladimir Ashkenazy, Daniil Trifonov and Seong-Jin Cho.

Biography

Early life and education
Goerne was born in Weimar. He grew up in a musical environment, his father being a dramaturgist and director of several acting theaters in Dresden. His first instrument was the cello, but he soon switched to singing. At the age of 9 he determined that he wanted to become a professional singer. He sang in the children's choirs of several of his father's theater productions, including Carmen and La Bohème. From the age of 18 to 22 he studied voice in Leipzig under . He would later refer to Beyer as being his most important teacher, and as the one who enabled him to start winning competitions. In 1989, he won second prize in the Robert Schumann Competition and first prizes in the Salomon-Lindberg and Hugo Wolf competitions. Two years into his studies, he won a singing competition in West Berlin. The head of the jury, composer and pianist Aribert Reimann, introduced him to Dietrich Fischer-Dieskau, whom Goerne considered his idol and the greatest artist he knew. He was to receive singing lessons from Fischer-Dieskau for 3 years.  Next, he studied with Elisabeth Schwarzkopf for two and a half to three years.

Career

1990s
Goerne made his professional début in Leipzig in 1990 after being invited by Kurt Masur to sing in Johann Sebastian Bach's St. Matthew Passion.

Goerne made his Salzburg Festival début in 1997 (Papageno).

2000s
From 2001 through 2005, Matthias Goerne taught as an honorary professor of song interpretation at the Robert Schumann Hochschule in Düsseldorf. In 2001, he was appointed an Honorary Member of the Royal Academy of Music in London.

2010s
In the late 2000s to 2014, he recorded a selection of Schubert lieder, The Goerne/Schubert Edition on 12 CDs, for Harmonia Mundi. The final volume, published in December 2014, received the highest rating in BBC Music magazine and a Diapason d'Or. His recording of Hanns Eisler lieder was awarded a Diapason d'Or de l'Année the same year.

Highlights of the 2011/12 season included a tour with the Vienna Philharmonic, appearances at the Vienna State Opera and the Saito Kinen Festival (Bluebeard with Seiji Ozawa) and song recitals with Christoph Eschenbach, and Leif Ove Andsnes in Paris, Vienna and New York (Carnegie Hall).

From 2012–2013, Matthias Goerne sang Wolfram at the Bavarian State Opera and Amfortas in concert with the Teatro Real in Madrid. Concert highlights included appearances with the Orchestre de Paris (Bluebeard), Berlin Philharmonic (War Requiem), Leipzig Gewandhaus Orchestra (Beethoven’s Ninth Symphony), Filarmonica del Teatro alla Scala (Mahler Lieder), Israel Philharmonic, and San Francisco Symphony (Wagner arias) as well as song recitals with Pierre-Laurent Aimard and Schubert cycles with Christoph Eschenbach at the Vienna Musikverein.

2020s

In 2020, Goerne signed with Deutsche Grammophon for a trilogy of Lieder albums to be released in 2020, 2021 and 2022 with pianists Jan Lisiecki, Seong-Jin Cho and Daniil Trifonov, respectively.

In 2021, German composer Detlev Glanert composed a setting for voice and orchestra of the poem Der Einsiedler (the hermit) by Joseph von Eichendorff especially for Goerne. It was performed by Goerne and the Concertgebouworkest under conductor Jaap van Zweden to critical acclaim.

Personal life

Goerne has an adopted son born in 1989, and a daughter born in 2000. His first marriage ended in divorce.

He smoked cigarettes "a lot" early in life, but stopped after noting the detrimental effects on his voice.

Goerne is not religious, although he does "have beliefs".

Views on music

Goerne has criticized the modern day relevance of opera productions, going so far as to state that most popular operas should not performed at all anymore because they have become outdated, no longer having "enough substance for the questions posed by our society".

He has expressed a distaste for most contemporary art music from a vocal perspective, claiming that its focus on using the extremes of the voice, "singing very high or very low, very loud or very quietly", is not conducive to the expression of thoughts and feelings. Furthermore, he opines that this style of vocal writing makes pieces "boring and one-dimensional".

Goerne has expressed a preference for working with solo pianists over pianists specialized in accompaniment, citing the former's superior artistic vision and the latter's relative lack of technical proficiency.

Awards and honors

Goerne is a recipient of the Wigmore Hall, London, medal.

References

Further reading

External links
 

1967 births
Living people
Musicians from Weimar
Deutsche Grammophon artists
People from Bezirk Erfurt
German operatic baritones
University of Music and Theatre Leipzig alumni
Honorary Members of the Royal Academy of Music